Adrienne Lecouvreur is a 1938 French-German biographical film directed by Marcel L'Herbier and starring Yvonne Printemps, Pierre Fresnay and Junie Astor. The film was a co-production between the two countries, and was made at UFA's Berlin Studios. It was based on the 1849 play Adrienne Lecouvreur by Eugène Scribe and Ernest Legouvé about the life of the eighteenth century actress Adrienne Lecouvreur.

The film's sets were designed by the art directors Ernst H. Albrecht and Anton Weber.

Plot
A famous actress and a Polish prince have an ill-fated love affair.

Cast
 Yvonne Printemps as Adrienne Lecouvreur
 Pierre Fresnay as Maurice de Saxe
 Junie Astor as the Duchess of Bouillon
 André Lefaur as the Duke of Bouillon
 Jaque Catelain as d'Argental
 Madeleine Sologne as Flora
 Pierre Larquey as Pitou
 Thomy Bourdelle as Pauly
 Jacqueline Pacaud as Fanchon
 Gabrielle Robinne as la Duclos
 Véra Pharès as little Adrienne
 Michèle Alfa as Amour
 Andrée Berty as a lady
 Mme Sabatini as a lady
 Edmond Castel as Folard
 Jean Joffre as the priest
 Philippe Richard as the doctor
 Pierre Juvenet as le gouvernor
 Albert Gercourt as the racketeer
 Geno Ferny as Jasmin
 Roger Blin as the alchemist
 Fernand Bercher as Voltaire
 Marcel André as the ruler
 Jean Worms as the Duke of Chaumont
 Hugues Wanner as Préville
 Michel Vitold as the murderer
 Michel Salina as Carvoy
 Lucien Walter as the hussar

References

Further reading

External links

1938 films
French historical drama films
French biographical drama films
German historical drama films
1930s French-language films
Films directed by Marcel L'Herbier
Films set in Paris
French films based on plays
Films based on works by Eugène Scribe
1930s historical drama films
Films set in the 1720s
Films set in the 1730s
German biographical drama films
French black-and-white films
German black-and-white films
UFA GmbH films
Cultural depictions of Adrienne Lecouvreur
Cultural depictions of Voltaire
1938 drama films
1930s French films
1930s German films